Bodmin St Leonard was an electoral division of Cornwall in the United Kingdom which returned one member to sit on Cornwall Council between 2013 and 2021. It was abolished at the 2021 local elections, being succeeded by Bodmin St Mary's and St Leonard.

Councillors

Extent
Bodmin St Leonard represented the centre of Bodmin and parts of the surrounding country, covering 246 hectares in total.

Election results

2017 election

2013 election

References

Electoral divisions of Cornwall Council
Bodmin